Bâtard (Batard in English transliteration) may refer to:

 Bâtard, a type of bread similar to baguette, but shorter
 Bâtard, a short novel by Jack London (1902)
 Bâtard-Montrachet, a grand cru vineyard in the Côte de Beaune
 La Batarde, a novel by Violette Leduc (1962)
 Bâtard (restaurant), a French restaurant in New York City

See also
 Bastard (disambiguation)